The 2021–22 Úrvalsdeild kvenna was the 65th season of the Úrvalsdeild kvenna, the top tier women's basketball league on Iceland. The season started on 6 October 2021 and concluded on 1 May 2022 with  Njarðvík after beating Haukar in the Úrvalsdeild finals, 3–2.

Competition format
The participating teams first play a conventional round-robin schedule with every team playing each opponent twice "home" and twice "away" for a total of 28 games. The top four teams qualify for the championship playoffs whilst the bottom team will be relegated to 1. deild kvenna.

Teams

Managerial changes

Regular season

Clubs in European competitions

Notable occurrences
On 2 June, Snæfell announced that it would withdraw its team from the Úrvalsdeild and register it in the second-tier 1. deild kvenna.
On 13 June, it was reported that Keflavík's forward Thelma Dís Ágústsdóttir would return to Ball State to finish her master's degree and her remaining college eligibility.
On 14 June, Fjölnir signed Dagný Lísa Davíðsdóttir who spent the previous season with the University of Wyoming and Hamar/Þór Þórlákshöfn. With Wyoming, Dagný averaged 9.0 stig and 5.4 fráköst and helped the team reach the round of 64 of the 2021 NCAA Division I women's basketball tournament. Following Wyoming's loss against UCLA, she joined Hamar/Þór and averaged 27.2 points and 13.7 rebounds in 6 games, including a 47 points outburst against Ármann in the playoffs.
On 15 June, the chairman of the Icelandic Basketball Association, Hannes S. Jónsson, confirmed that Njarðvík would take the seat left vacant by Snæfell in the Úrvalsdeild. KR, which finished last in the Úrvalsdeild during the 2020-21 season, had been offered the seat but declined.
On 19 June, Helena Sverrisdóttir left Valur aftur three seasons and signed back with her hometown team of Haukar.
On 29 June, Haukar signed a three-year contract with Sólrún Inga Gísladóttir who had spent the last four years with the College of Coastal Georgia.
On 1 July, Breiðablik signed former Snæfell starter Anna Soffía Lárusdóttir who averaged 14.5 points and 6.5 rebounds the previous season.
On 6 July, Haukar signed Haiden Palmer who led the league in assists the previous season while playing for Snæfell.
On 11 July, Icelandic national team member  Emelía Ósk Gunnarsdóttir confirmed she would be leaving Keflavík and moving to Sweden to continue her education.
On 12 July, Icelandic national team member Sóllilja Bjarnadóttir confirmed she would be leaving Breiðablik and moving to Sweden to continue her doctorate education.
On 30 July, Keflavík signed Romania national team member Tünde Kilin.
On 4 August,  Grindavík signed former Arizona State guard Robbi Ryan.
On 6 August, Sara Rún Hinriksdóttir left Haukar and signed with CS Phoenix Constanța of the Romanian Liga Națională.
On 6 August, Þóra Kristín Jónsdóttir was reported to have signed with Dameligaen club AKS Falcon after playing the previous nine seasons with Haukar.
On 21 August, the captain of  Keflavík, Erna Hákonardóttir, announced her retirement from basketball after 11 seasons where she won the national championship three times.
On 15 November, Breiðablik signed former WNBA draftpick Micaela Kelly to replace Chelsey Shumpert.
On 9 December, the board of Skallagrímur announced that they were withdrawing the team from competition. The team had played 11 games, all losses.
On 21 December, it was reported that Haiden Denise Palmer had been released by Haukar at her own request after averaging 9.6 points, 9.7 rebounds and 7.6 assists in 7 Úrvalsdeild games.
On 26 December, Haukar signed Keira Robinson to fill the roster spot left by Haiden Palmer.
On 3 January, Valur signed Finnish forward Heta Äijänen who had started the season with Advisora Mataro Maresme in Spain.
On 26 March, Sigrún Sjöfn Ámundadóttir became the Úrvalsdeild all-time leader in rebounds when she broke Hildur Sigurðardóttir's record of 2,882 career rebounds in a victory against Grindavík.
On 30 March, Fjölnir clinched the best record in the league and home court advantage throughout the playoffs.

References

External links
Official Icelandic Basketball Federation website

Icelandic
Lea
Úrvalsdeild kvenna seasons (basketball)